Abreus is a municipality and town in the Cienfuegos Province of Cuba. It was founded in 1840.

History
Abreus was founded as San Segundo de los Abreu in 1840 by Trinidadian landowners during an economic boom of slave-labor sugar cane plantations.

Geography
The municipality includes the town of Abreus and the villages of Babiney, Carmelina, Cayo Grande, Charcas, Cienguita, Constancia, Horquitas, Juraguá, Matun, Mijailito, Navarra, Nueva Juraguá, San Ignacio, Simpatía and Yaguaramas. It is bordered by Ciénaga de Zapata and Calimete, both in Matanzas Province, and by Aguada de Pasajeros, Rodas and Cienfuegos.

Demographics
In 2019, the municipality of Abreus had a population of 30,719; 51% of the population identified as men.

Notable natives
Ángel Fleitas (1914-2006) - former shortstop for the Washington Senators
Yoan Moncada (born 1995) - third baseman for the Chicago White Sox

See also
Municipalities of Cuba
List of cities in Cuba
Juragua Nuclear Power Plant

References

External links

 Abreus on EcuRed

Populated places in Cienfuegos Province